Domenico Procacci (born 8 February 1960) is an Italian film producer.

Life and career 
Born in Bari,  Procacci  debuted as a producer in  the late 1980s, when he co-founded with Renzo Rossellini and others the production company Vertigo. In 1990 he founded the company Fandango, which debuted with a box office hit, Sergio Rubini's La stazione. He soon specialized in producing small-budget art films directed by young directors. In 1992, he started a long collaboration with Rolf de Heer, producing and even distributing his films in Italy, and in  2002 he co-founded with de Heer, Richard Lowenstein, Sue Murray and Bryce Menzies the production company Fandango Australia.

Procacci won four David di Donatello Awards for best producer, and four Silver Ribbons in the same category.

In 2014, Procacci had a son with Kasia Smutniak, whom he married in September 2019.

Selected filmography 

 1990  - The Station   
 1992  - Flight of the Innocent
 1993 - Bad Boy Bubby 
 1994   - Like Two Crocodiles
 1994  - The Life and Extraordinary Adventures of Private Ivan Chonkin 
 1996  - Bits and Pieces 
 1996  - The Quiet Room 
 1997  - The Grey Zone 
 1998  - Radiofreccia 
 1998  - Dance Me to My Song 
 1998  - Ecco fatto 
 1998  - The Ice Rink 
 1998  - The Room of the Scirocco 
 1999  - But Forever in My Mind 
 2000  - Johnny the Partisan 
 2001  - The Monkey's Mask 
 2001  - The Last Kiss 
 2001  - Dark Blue World 
 2001  - Dust 
 2001  - He Died with a Felafel in His Hand 
 2002  - The Tracker 
 2002  - The Embalmer 
 2002  - Respiro 
 2002  - Maximum Velocity (V-Max) 
 2003  - Remember Me, My Love 
 2003  - Alexandra's Project  
 2003  - Secret File 
 2003  - Break Free  
 2004  - First Love 
 2004  - The Consequences of Love 
 2004  - Lavorare con lentezza 
 2005  - Tickets 
 2005  - Mario's War 
 2006  - Our Land 
 2006  - Ten Canoes 
 2006  - The Family Friend 
 2007  - Dr. Plonk 
 2007  - Silk  
 2007  - The Right Distance 
 2007  - Don't Waste Your Time, Johnny! 
 2008  - Quiet Chaos 
 2008  - The Past Is a Foreign Land 
 2008  - Seven Pounds 
 2008  - Gomorrah
 2008  - Un giorno perfetto 
 2009  - The White Space 
 2009   - Cosmonaut
 2010  - Kiss Me Again 
 2010  - Loose Cannons 
 2010  - Barney's Version 
 2010  - La passione 
 2011  - Qualunquemente 
 2011  - The Perfect Life 
 2011  - The Forgiveness of Blood 
 2011  - Habemus Papam 
 2011  - The Last Man on Earth 
 2011  - Drifters 
 2012  - Diaz – Don't Clean Up This Blood 
 2012  - Magnificent Presence 
 2012  - Reality 
 2013  - The Fifth Wheel  
 2014  - A Woman as a Friend  
 2014  - I Can Quit Whenever I Want  
 2015  - Mia Madre
 2018  - Il ragazzo più felice del mondo

References

External links
 

1960 births
David di Donatello winners
Italian film producers
Living people
Nastro d'Argento winners
Ciak d'oro winners
People from Bari